"" ("Our Beautiful Homeland") is the national anthem of Croatia. Often simply referred to as "" ("Our Beautiful") in Croatia, it is a phrase widely used as a metonym for the country.

History 

The original lyrics were written by Antun Mihanović and first published under the title Horvatska domovina (Croatian homeland) in 1835. In 1846, Josip Runjanin (1821–1878) composed the music for Horvatska domovina. Runjanin's army bandmaster Josip Wendl adapted his music for a military brass orchestra. The original form of the melody is unknown because the original has not been recovered to this day.

The song was scored and harmonized for a male choir by a teacher and organist of the Zagreb Cathedral Vatroslav Lichtenegger in 1861, and after that it started to be performed as the Croatian people's ethnic anthem. The title "Lijepa naša" has been applied since that time. The original text has 14 verses. Since then, a few minor adjustments have been made to the lyrics.

The song was not immediately adopted by the Croatian Parliament as the national anthem. In 1907, the Association of Croatian Singing Clubs requested the parliament to do so but received no response, even though the song was used as the state anthem in unofficial capacity at ceremonies, including the 29 October 1918 session of parliament when Croatia formally dissolved its ties with Austria-Hungary.

Between 1918 and 1941, segments of the Croatian national anthem were part of the national anthem of the Kingdom of Yugoslavia and it was unofficial hymn of Croats. During the World War II, in the Independent State of Croatia it was also used as state anthem, albeit with some modifications to the lyrics. Croatian Partisans were also using it, for example during ZAVNOH sessions.

The song officially became the state anthem of Croatia through amendments of the Constitution of Croatia adopted by the parliament of the SR Croatia on 29 February 1972. It was confirmed by constitutions of 1974 and 1990, when its lyrics were slightly modified, and by the Coat of Arms, the Flag and the National Anthem of the Republic of Croatia Act.

Lyrics

Official lyrics 
On most occasions, only the first verse is performed.

Lyrics to Horvatska domovina

The poem first published in the cultural magazine Danica ilirska, No. 10, edited by Ljudevit Gaj, in 1835 originally consisted of fourteen verses but today, only verses one, two, thirteen, and fourteen are part of the national anthem.

Notes

References

Further reading

External links 

 Croatia: Lijepa naša domovino – Audio of the national anthem of Croatia, with information and lyrics (archive link)
 

1846 songs
Croatian songs
European anthems
National symbols of Croatia
National anthems
National anthem compositions in C major